National Route 3 is a trunk highway that is mostly known as the Circunvalar de Providencia or Circunvalación de la Isla de Providencia. This route runs along the perimeter of Providencia Island in the department of San Andrés and Providencia.

References

Buildings and structures in the Archipelago of San Andrés, Providencia and Santa Catalina
Highways in Colombia